Jon Ireland (born 26 September 1967) is a former professional tennis player from Australia.  

Ireland enjoyed most of his tennis success while playing doubles.  During his career he won 1 doubles title.  He achieved a career-high doubles ranking of World No. 90 in 1995.

Career finals

Doubles (1 title, 2 runner-ups)

External links
 
 

Australian male tennis players
Tennis players from Sydney
1967 births
Living people
20th-century Australian people